Riders in the Sky may refer to:

 "(Ghost) Riders in the Sky: A Cowboy Legend", a 1948 country and cowboy-style song
 Riders in the Sky (band), named after the song
 Riders in the Sky (David and the Giants album), 1983
 Riders in the Sky (film), a 1949 film directed by John English
 Nebeští jezdci (Riders in the Sky), a 1968 Czech film
 Riders in the Sky (TV series), 1991
 Riders in the Sky, Live, a 1984 album by Riders in the Sky
 Riders in the Sky, an album by Matchbox